The Thailand Five's Futsal Tournament is the international championship for futsal, the indoor version of association football organized by Football Association of Thailand or FA Thailand.

The Thailand Five's tournament is held every year. The first event was held in 2003.

Results

Medal summary

Participating nations

All-time table

References

International futsal competitions hosted by Thailand